Natasha Daly is a former England women's international footballer. Her greatest achievement was playing in the winning games of the 1998 FA Women's Cup Final with Arsenal.

Honours
Arsenal
 FA Women's Cup: 1998

References

Living people
Arsenal W.F.C. players
English women's footballers
FA Women's National League players
England women's international footballers
Women's association football forwards
Year of birth missing (living people)